The 1982 Gael Linn Cup, the most important representative competition for elite level participants in the women's team field sport of camogie, was won by Munster, who defeated Leinster in the final, played at Na Fianna, Glasnevin.

Arrangements
Leinster defeated Ulster 10–17 to 2–4 at Eglish, Munster defeated Connacht 2–3 to 0–2 at Tynagh. A last minute point by Mary O'Leary, who scored 2–8 in all, helped Munster defeat Leinster 3–10 to 2–12 at Na Fianna Grounds. She had done the same in the All-Ireland final few weeks previously, Munster's other goal came from Marion Sweeney five minutes into the second half, which proved the turning point of the game. Angela Downey scored 1–6 for Leinster, who pressed for an equaliser throughout the three minutes of added time.

Gael Linn Trophy
Leinster defeated Ulster by 3–11 to 1–4 in the trophy semi-final at Eglish while Connacht defeated Munster 3–3 to 0–5 at Na Fianna. Leinster defeated Connacht by 3–16 to 2–8 in the final.

Final stages

|}

Junior Final

|}

References

External links
 Camogie Association

1982 in camogie
1982